Sardar Mosque is located in Urmia, Imam Street near the Menareh Mosque.

References

Mosques in Iran
Mosque buildings with domes
National works of Iran
Buildings of the Qajar period
Buildings and structures in Urmia